Sade Daal (born 30 September 1988) is a Surinamese swimmer, who specialized in sprint freestyle events. Daal qualified for the women's 50 m freestyle, as a 15-year-old, at the 2004 Summer Olympics in Athens, by receiving a Universality place from FINA, in an entry time of 29.14. She challenged seven other swimmers in heat four, including 31-year-old Melanie Slowing of Guatemala. She rounded out the field to last place in 29.27, just 0.13 of a second off her personal best. Daal failed to advance into the semifinals, as she placed fifty-fourth overall out of 75 swimmers on the last day of preliminaries.

References

1988 births
Living people
Surinamese female swimmers
Olympic swimmers of Suriname
Swimmers at the 2004 Summer Olympics
Pan American Games competitors for Suriname
Swimmers at the 2003 Pan American Games
Competitors at the 2006 Central American and Caribbean Games
Surinamese female freestyle swimmers
Sportspeople from Paramaribo